Tangled Lives is a 1918 American silent drama film directed by Paul Scardon and starring Harry T. Morey, Betty Blythe and Jean Paige.

Cast
 Harry T. Morey as John Howland 
 Betty Blythe as Hilda Howland 
 Jean Paige as Lola Maynard 
 Albert Roccardi as Peter Hyde 
 George Majeroni as Paul West 
 Eulalie Jensen as Cora West 
 Charles Kent as Col. West

References

Bibliography
 Robert B. Connelly. The Silents: Silent Feature Films, 1910-36, Volume 40, Issue 2. December Press, 1998.

External links
 

1918 films
1918 drama films
1910s English-language films
American silent feature films
Silent American drama films
American black-and-white films
Vitagraph Studios films
Films directed by Paul Scardon
1910s American films